Ludwig Schick (born 22 September 1949) is a prelate of the Roman Catholic Church. He served as archbishop of Bamberg from 2002 to 2022. He was auxiliary bishop of Fulda from 1998 to 2002.

Life 
Born in Marburg, Schick was ordained to the priesthood on 15 June 1975, serving in Fulda.

On 20 May 1998, he was appointed auxiliary bishop of Fulda and titular bishop of Auzia. Schick received his episcopal consecration on the following 12 July from Johannes Dyba, archbishop-bishop of Fulda, with the auxiliary bishop of Fulda, Johannes Kapp, and the bishop of San Marcos, Alvaro Leonel Ramazzini Imeri, serving as co-consecrators.

On 28 June 2002, he was appointed archbishop of Bamberg.

In 2021, he worked along with the German bishops to deliver aid to famine-hit southern Madagascar during the food crisis that began there in mid-2021. He had previously visited Madagascar.

Pope Francis accepted his resignation on 1 November 2022.

References

External links 

Entry about Ludwig Schick at catholic-hierarchy.org

1949 births
21st-century Roman Catholic archbishops in Germany
20th-century German Roman Catholic bishops
Archbishops of Bamberg
Living people
20th-century German Roman Catholic priests
People from Marburg